Jan Remmers (September 30, 1922 - April 3, 2013) was a football coach and former footballer from the Netherlands. He coached N.E.C. Nijmegen, FC Den Bosch and RKC Waalwijk, among others.

Professional career
Remmers worked for N.E.C. Nijmegen for nine years, from 1961 to 1970. In 1964, N.E.C. won the Dutch third division. Three years later, in the 1966–67 season, N.E.C. won promotion to Eredivisie, as second behind FC Volendam. and in 1969 they participated in the  Intertoto Cup. Remmers then coached FC Den Bosch from 1970 to 1974 and RKC Waalwijk. Den Bosch won the Eerste Divisie in the 1970–71 season, and promoted to the Eredivisie.

N.E.C. Nijmegen's classifications from 1961 to 1970
1961–62: 9th in the Tweede Divisie
1962–63: 3rd in the Tweede Divisie
1963–64: 1st in the Tweede Divisie, promotion to the Eerste Divisie
1964–65: 10th in the Eerste Divisie
1965–66: 6th in the Eerste Divisie
1966–67: 2nd in the Eerste Divisie, promotion to the Eredivisie
1967–68: 10th in the  Eredivisie
1968–69: 12th in the  Eredivisie, promotion to the Intertoto Cup
1969–70: 11th in the  Eredivisie

References

External links
Profile at Voetbal International

1922 births
2013 deaths
Dutch football managers
NEC Nijmegen managers
FC Den Bosch managers
RKC Waalwijk managers
Sportspeople from 's-Hertogenbosch
Footballers from North Brabant
Dutch footballers
Association football defenders